Meenu Gaur is a London-based British-Indian director and screenwriter. She is best known for her 2013 Pakistani film Zinda Bhaag which she co-wrote and co-directed with Farjab Nabi. The film was an entry to the foreign film category at the Oscars. She is presently working on a feature film titled 'Barzakh:Between Heaven and Hell' supported by the Locarno International Film Festival's Open Doors Hub Programme. She has also been part of Berlinale Talents and the NIPKOW film residency in Berlin, supported by Berlinale and Medienboard. Recently, SOAS, University of London installed her portrait on the school walls as part of the Alumni Series that celebrates notable alumni.

Zinda Bhaag

In 2013 Meenu co-directed a Pakistani film Zinda Bhaag, under the film production company Matteela Films.  Meenu got immense praise from Pakistani film directors and critics for putting forward Pakistani cinema into limelight again. Zinda Bhaag became one of the highest-grossing of Pakistan and has won many accolades and recognition including an official selection for Best Foreign Language Film at 86th Academy Awards however was out of the competition for the final race. Zinda Bhaag was only the third Pakistani film in 50 years to be submitted at the Oscars, after 1959's The Day Shall Dawn and 1963's The Veil. Zinda Bhaag earned her critical acclaim worldwide and was theatrically released in USA, UAE and Pakistan. It was subsequently released on Netflix in 2015.

Qatil Haseenaon Ke Naam

Qatil Haseenaon Ke Naam is an Indian and Pakistani crime fiction drama original web series streaming on ZEE5. It is created and directed by British-Indian director Meenu Gaur and written by Farjad Nabi and Meenu Gaur. The series is produced by Hasan Raza Abidi and Shailja Kejriwal. This six episode web series was released on 10 December 2021. It stars Rubya Chaudhry, Sanam Saeed, Sarwat Gilani, Eman Suleman and Faiza Gillani in the lead roles.

World on Fire

In 2022, Meenu Gaur directed episodes on the second season of BBC's hit drama, World on Fire. The second series will air on BBC One and BBC iPlayer in 2023.

Murder is Easy

On February 22, 2023 it was announced that she would direct Murder is Easy, based on the classic novel by Agatha Christie. The show is being adapted by Sian Ejiwunmi-Le Berre, produced by Mammoth Screen and Agatha Christie Limited for BBC One and iPlayer, with BritBox International.

Filmography and awards

References

External links 
 

Living people
People from Kolkata
Year of birth missing (living people)
Lady Shri Ram College alumni
Alumni of SOAS University of London
Indian women film directors
Indian emigrants to the United Kingdom